The Singapore Grounds, or better known as Singapore Polo Club is a varied sports centre in Singapore. It is one of the oldest grounds in Singapore.

History
Polo was introduced to Singapore by officers of the King's Own Royal Regiment who were stationed on the island. The Singapore Polo Club was founded in 1886, making it the oldest polo team in what was once British Malaya and one of the oldest sporting and social clubs in Singapore. From its formation until 1914, it played at the Race Course, a major sports venue up until the 1930s, in present-day Farrer Park.

Grounds
The Singapore Polo Club was located at Balestier Road since 1914, but moved to Mount Pleasant for needs of better facilities. After numerous fundraising attempts, the grounds were finally founded by Singapore Turf Club, on the condition that they use it as a practice and recreational grounds and had status of it. The Japanese Imperial Army sent volunteers to collaborate in the attempts of a national identity, and the ground was complete and open for play by 1941.

However, during The Second World War, the ground was used as a gun emplacement area by The Japanese Defence Forces and was rented as a squatters camp by the Salvation Army and Japanese Defence Forces. After the war, Lord Mountbatten became the patron of the ground and re-established the Polo Club. He used his British and Royal influence to renovate the Grounds and establish it as an improved playing area, with a newly renovated pitch.

Pitch

A new type of grass called Desso GrassMaster was installed in 2000 to improve to surface's quality. The grass, which is natural grass with enhanced artificial roots, is suitable for polo, Gaelic football and hurling, as well as the other sports played there.

Facilities
The ground also has a number of suites and other activities. There is a bar and restaurant, riding area, gym, spa, Jacuzzi, swimming pool, as well as two tennis courts and the pitch.

Other sports
The following sports are all facilitated there:
Aikido
Archery
Soccer
Fencing
Pilates
Polo
Show jumping
Dressage
Squash
Swimming
Tennis

See also
 Gaelic games
 International rules football
 List of Gaelic Athletic Association stadiums

References

Multi-sport clubs in Singapore
Polo in Asia
Sports clubs in Singapore
Polo clubs